The men's pole vault event at the 2019 Summer Universiade was held on 10 and 12 July at the Stadio San Paolo in Naples.

Medalists

Results

Qualification
Qualification: 5.60 m (Q) or at least 12 best (q) qualified for the final.

Final

References

Pole
2019